Bhole Shankar is a 2008 Indian Bhojpuri language masala film directed by Pankaj Shukla and produced by Gulshan Bhatia, starring Mithun Chakraborty and Manoj Tiwari. The film broke the standing record for biggest opening for a Bhojpuri film.

Synopsis 
Bhole Shankar revolves around the unemployment issue where Mithun Chakraborty plays the role of Shankar, an underworld Don and the elder brother of Bhole, played by Manoj Tiwari. Bhole Shankar  is the first Bhojpuri film of Mithun Chakraborty.

Cast 
Mithun Chakraborty as Shankar
Manoj Tiwari as Bhole
Monalisa
Lovy Rohtagi
Gopal Singh
Shabnam Kapoor
Rajesh Vivek
Shivendu Shukla
Nishtha
Ujjwal

Soundtrack
The film's music was composed by Dhananjay Mishra and the lyrics were written by Bipin Bahaar. Playback singer Shailender Singh came out of retirement to perform the song "Jai Ho Chhath Maiya" for the film.
"Re Bauraee Chanchal Kirniya" – Raja Hasan
"Dil Ke Haal Bataeen Kaise"  – Mauli Dave
"Tori Marji" -Poonam Yadav, Manoj Tiwari
"Piya More Gaile Rama" – Indu Sonali
"Naak Ke Nathiya" – Manoj Tiwari
"Kehu Sapna Mein" – Kalpana, Udit Narayan
"Jai Ho Chhath Maiya" – Shailendra Singh, Malini Awasthi
"Jab Jab Aave Yaad" – Indu Sonali, Ujjaini, Manoj Tiwari
"Ae Bhai Ji" – Manoj Tiwari

Box office
The film was initially banned in Bihar.

References

2008 films
Films shot in Lucknow
2000s Bhojpuri-language films
Films scored by Dhananjay Mishra